Apoy sa Karagatan is a 2001 Philippine action film written and directed by Mauro Gia Samonte. The film stars Jestoni Alarcon, Tonton Gutierrez, Tara Vios and Kara Kristel.

The film is streaming online on YouTube.

Plot
Johnny Laguna (Jestoni), a bounty hunter, is on a mission to rescue Anna (Kara) from the hands of her abductor (Derek). Michael Tantongco (Tonton), Anna's husband who is the town mayor, is willing to give a reward of P1 million to whoever can rescue his wife.

Cast
 Jestoni Alarcon as Johnny
 Tonton Gutierrez as Michael
 Derek Dee
 Edgar Mamnde
 Tara Vios
 Kara Kristel as Anna
 Robert Miller
 Froilan Sales
 Alex Bolado
 Eddie Patis
 Christian Galindo

Production
Production of the film took over a month from October to November 2000 in Real, Quezon. It was in late June 2001, a month after Jestoni on as councilor of Antipolo, when it was finally released.

References

External links

Full Movie on Regal Entertainment

2001 films
2001 action films
Filipino-language films
Philippine action films
Films directed by Mauro Gia Samonte
Regal Entertainment films